The School of St. Jude is a charity-funded school located in the city of Arusha, in the northern Arusha Region of Tanzania. With its three campuses, the school provides free primary and secondary education to children in the Arusha Region. It also provides board for over 1,000 students and employs over 270 local Tanzanian staff members. It was founded by Australian Gemma Sisia in 2002, based on the belief that education is the best way to fight poverty.

History
The school was founded in 2002 by Australian Gemma Sisia, who dreamed of helping end poverty in Africa. She named the school after St Jude, the patron saint of hopeless causes. The school provides free education to over 1,800 girls and boys from the poorest families in the area. It is 100% charity-funded and receives no government assistance from Tanzania or Australia. 90% of the school's funding comes from Australian families, who signed up to sponsor a child or donate.

Each year, the school selects approximately 150 new students who show academic promise, combined with genuine and demonstrable financial need. These girls and boys are then provided with international-standard education, accommodation, and three meals per day.

In 2015, the school's first graduating class, Form 6, finished within the top 10% in Tanzania.

Infrastructure
The school occupies three campuses. The primary campus, visitors' center and administrative office are located in the Moshono neighborhood of Arusha. Boarding for primary students from Class 5 and above is a 15-minute walk away in the Moivaro neighborhood. The secondary school campus, including its own boarding facilities and a 6-acre school farm, is located a 20-minute drive away from the primary campus in the town of Usa River.

St. Jude's operates 27 school buses. Two libraries house over thirty thousand books, CDs, and DVDs. Students have access to science labs, sports fields, and computer and art rooms. All students eat hot lunches and a snack every day. The boarding students also receive breakfast and dinner. The school provides an estimated one million meals a year. The school employs over 270 East African staff and over 15 international volunteers from around the world.

Girls' education
Girls make up over half of the school's student body, and this percentage was reached without the use of quotas. The school follows only two criteria in its recruitment: academic talent and a genuine financial need.

Rotary Australia
On the advice of Sisia's father, she contacted local Rotary clubs close to where her family lived. Gemma and a family friend, David Steller, worked the phones and engaged members of local Rotary clubs in Australia, who, in turn, brought local schools on board.

They put up a table in a shopping mall where volunteers took turns selling $2 paper bricks representing the building works that needed financing. In a few months, they managed to raise the necessary funds. Thus began the long-term partnership between The School of St Jude and Rotary.

Gemma engaged in subsequent speaking events at Rotary Clubs across Australia, which led to an increase in donors.  In 2000, when it was time to build the school, Armidale Central Rotary Club organized a group of 13 volunteers to travel to Tanzania and build the first block of classrooms. This was the first of many volunteer teams of Rotarians to get personally involved with the school. Rotarians who remained in Australia helped with the collection and transportation of computers, library and school books, teaching aids, classroom equipment, sports equipment, sewing machines, clothes and other goods. Many Rotarians visit the school each year.

In 2016, senior St Jude's students founded youth Rotary branches of their own.

US support and charitable status
The secondary campus is named after the American Smith family, of the Gordon V. and Helen C. Smith Foundation, based in the Washington, D.C. area of the United States. Their connection to St Jude's came about after the family traveled together to Tanzania for a safari in 2004 and the tour guide took them to visit a local public school. The Smiths have a long history of supporting educational initiatives. After seeing classes with up to 120 students and few resources, they decided to support a nonprofit initiative providing educational opportunities in Tanzania. A couple of months later, family members returned to Arusha, visited a number of schools and decided to get involved with St Jude's. Their donation and personal involvement made it possible for St Jude's to extend its educational offering to the secondary school level.

In September 2016 the school announced that the American Friends of the School of St Jude, Tanzania, Inc. launched a new website. St Jude’s U.S. fundraising efforts are officially recognized as a 501(c)(3) public charity and the American Friends organization has been granted official tax-exempt status EIN 47-3077055.

Visitors and word of mouth
As part of its fundraising and marketing activities, the school receives hundred of visitors each year for day tours of the school grounds. Sponsors of students are encouraged to visit and can participate in a home visit with their family. Up to 60 visitors can stay in hotel-style accommodation.

The school also offers special two- or three-week tours including safaris in the Serengeti and Ngorongoro Crater national parks, excursions to see local tribes, and trips to Zanzibar.

Gemma Sisia
Gemma Sisia (née Rice) was born on November 3, 1971. She spent her early years on a wool sheep property just outside Guyra in Northern New South Wales, Australia. As the only daughter among the eight children of Sue and Basil Rice, Gemma had to learn how to keep up with her brothers when it came to mustering sheep and riding horses. Sue Rice still lives on the family property in Guyra and a number of her brothers still live in the area. Basil, Gemma's father, passed away in 2004.

After completing secondary studies at St Vincent's College in Sydney, Gemma decided to pursue a Bachelor of Science at University. She majored in Genetics and Biochemistry at Melbourne University and the University of Northern Territory where she was awarded a First Class degree. Gemma concluded her tertiary studies with a Diploma of Education through the University of New England in Armidale.

At 22 years old, Gemma decided to devote time to volunteer with the poor in Africa. She traveled to Uganda, East Africa, to work for three years as a volunteer teacher. This experience led to her interest in access to quality education.

Upon returning to Australia, Gemma began fundraising to help underprivileged children in Uganda complete their schooling. She raised enough money to start an official fund to invest in the education of East Africa's poorest children. After realising that the funds were not being distributed properly, she returned to East Africa to manage the money herself.

While working in Uganda, Gemma went on a holiday to neighboring Tanzania. It was on safari that she met Richard Sisia, her safari driver, who would later become her husband. In 1998 Daniel Sisia, Richard's father and Gemma's father in law, gifted her a small plot of land in Arusha to build a school for the poor. Gemma started building The School of St Jude on this land with a mission to help the poorest children receive an education. The school opened in 2002 with three sponsored students and has consistently grown

In 2000, Gemma was awarded a Sapphire Paul Harris Fellow by Rotary International. Gemma's autobiography, St Jude's, was published by Pan Macmillan Australia in 2007 and remained on the Best Sellers List for over two months. Also in 2007, Gemma's achievements were honored by an Order of Australia medal. Gemma's story has been featured twice in the ABC television documentary program Australian Story, in 2005 and a follow-up in 2009. In 2012, Gemma was named one of The Australian Financial Review and Westpac's 100 Women of Influence, nominated in the Global category. She was also a finalist in New South Wales for Australian of the Year.

Timeline

1998
Daniel Sisia gives Gemma and Richard two acres of land for a school. 
Gemma receives her first donation of $10 AUD from Agnes Hanna to kickstart the fundraising.

2000
Rotary Club of Armidale Central builds the first classroom block.

2001
Gemma makes Tanzania 'home'.

2002
St Jude's opens on January 29 with three students and teacher, Angela Bailey. 
The School Board and Parents' Committee are formed. 
Rotary Australia offers tax deductibility, thanks to Monica Hart and Jack Elliot.

2003
St Jude's educates 120 students and employs 23 local staff.
The Yellow House is built. Volunteers no longer stay in tents.

2004
St Jude's educates 423 students and employs over 80 local staff
A library, football field and 12 new classrooms are built. 
The bus fleet grows to 8. 
Students and staff can now enjoy hot lunches. 
St Jude's connects to the internet.

2005
Gemma is featured on the ABC Television program Australian Story for the first time.
Parents' Committee reaches 20 members.
Australian, Richard Pagliaro, creates the school's first website. 
Moshono dining hall opens.
The first Grade 4 students sit Tanzania's National Exam and rank third of 204 schools in the district.

2006
St Jude's educates 662 students and employs 114 local staff.
The first Culture Day is held at St Jude's. 
30 acres at Usa River is bought for a second campus.
The school celebrates its first St Jude's Day, an annual event that allows students to give thanks.

2007
St Jude's educates 850 students and employs 127 local staff. 
The first annual medical check team comes to St Jude's. 
Gemma receives an Order of Australia award.
Australian launch of Gemma's book Gemma's book St Jude's.
Moivaro boarding campus opens for 300 students.

2008
St Jude's educates 989 students and employs 330 local staff
Usa River Primary Campus opens with 500 students, 250 of whom move into new boarding houses. 
The first Grade 7 class sits the National Exam and all perform in the top 10% of the country. Alex Elifas is 23rd out of over one million students.

2009
Gemma is again featured on Australian Story and speaks at Australia's Parliament House. 
Moshono Secondary Campus opens with 51 Form 1 students. It's the first time student selections for Form 1 are held. 
150 staff and students attend dinner with Tanzanian President Jakaya Kikwete. 
The GFC hits: 47 staff retrenched and 10% salary sacrifice is introduced. 
St Jude's has three Tanzanian headmasters.

2010
St Jude's educates over 1,300 students (with 900 in boarding), employs over 340 local staff, and serves 772,000 meals. 
10% salary sacrifice is abandoned. 
The school's Form 2 students rank 3rd out of 302 schools in the National Exams - North West Zone. 
Bus fleet grows to 20.

2011
A worldwide appeal for a new sports ground raises over $115,000.
St Jude's provides over 850,000 meals.

2012
The School of St Jude celebrates its 10-year anniversary on January 29. 
Form 4 National Exam results place St Jude's 1st in the Arusha region and 7th in Tanzania. 
Australian Financial Review and Westpac nominate Gemma as one of the '100 Women of Influence'.

2013
Felix Mollel is the first of our Tanzanian staff to officially promote St Jude'overseas.
Form 4 National Exam results place St Jude's 3rd in the Arusha region and 20th in Tanzania.

2014
St Jude's educates 1,832 students. 
The first Form 6 students start and it's the first time St Jude's has students in every year. The school now educates over 1,800 students and is getting ready for its first high school graduation in 2015.

2015
St Jude's educates 1,899 students with 1,389 in boarding. 
93% of our 339 staff are Tanzanian.
Bus fleet reaches 27. 
On May 30, The School of St Jude celebrates the inaugural Form 6 Graduation with 61 graduates and over 1,000 family, community members, students, staff and international visitors. 
St Jude's first Beyond St Jude's (BSJ) interns commence their Community Service Year, teaching over 10,000 students in 21 government schools.

2016
131 graduates celebrate Form 6 Graduation with hundreds of local and international St Jude's community members. 
St Jude's features on 60 Minutes Australia, viewed by over 800,000 Australian households. 
St Jude's first Beyond St Jude's scholars start university, with over a third enrolled in Medicine. 
Form 6 graduate, Dorice Livingstone, is the first St Jude's graduate to travel to Australia with Gemma. 
St Jude's establishes a Future Fund to underwrite the long-term future of the school.

2017
St Jude's hosts the 2018 Gold Coast Commonwealth Games Queen's Baton Relay. 
133 graduates celebrate the third annual Ford 6 Graduation with hundreds of local and international St Jude's community members.

See also

 Education in Tanzania
 List of schools in Tanzania

References

External links
 , the school's official website
 https://www.afstjude.org , the American Friends of St Jude website

2002 establishments in Tanzania
Arumeru District
Boarding schools in Tanzania
Buildings and structures in Arusha
Co-educational boarding schools
Educational institutions established in 2002
Primary schools in Tanzania
Private schools in Tanzania
Secondary schools in Tanzania